Dr. Franklin King House-Idlewild is a historic home located at Eden, Rockingham County, North Carolina. It was built in 1875, and is a -story, style frame dwelling with a -story tower.  It combines elements of the Italianate, Queen Anne and Gothic Revival styles.

It was listed on the National Register of Historic Places in 1983.

References

Houses on the National Register of Historic Places in North Carolina
Gothic Revival architecture in North Carolina
Italianate architecture in North Carolina
Queen Anne architecture in North Carolina
Houses completed in 1875
Houses in Rockingham County, North Carolina
National Register of Historic Places in Rockingham County, North Carolina